Group B of the 1999 Fed Cup Europe/Africa Zone Group I was one of four pools in the Europe/Africa Zone Group I of the 1999 Fed Cup. Four teams competed in a round robin competition, with the top two teams advancing to the knockout stage.

Romania vs. Greece

Sweden vs. Portugal

Romania vs. Portugal

Sweden vs. Greece

Romania vs. Sweden

Greece vs. Portugal

  failed to win any ties in the pool, and thus was relegated to Group II in 2000, where they placed third in their pool of six.

See also
Fed Cup structure

References

External links
 Fed Cup website

1999 Fed Cup Europe/Africa Zone